The Medal of Bravery is a decoration that is, within the Canadian system of honours, the third highest award for bravery, and one of the three Canadian Bravery Decorations gifted by the Canadian monarch, generally through his or her viceroy-in-Council. Created in 1972, the medal is presented to both living and deceased individuals deemed to have performed "acts of bravery in hazardous circumstances," and grants recipients the ability to use the post-nominal letters MB.

Design
The Medal of Bravery is in the form of a  diameter silver medal with, on the reverse, the Royal Cypher of the reigning monarch beneath a St. Edward's Crown, symbolizing the Canadian monarch's role as the fount of honour, and the inscription BRAVERY • BRAVOURE. The obverse bears a maple leaf surrounded by a laurel wreath, and the name and rank of the recipient is engraved on the medal's edge.

This medallion is worn on the left chest, on a 31.8mm wide ribbon coloured red with three vertical blue stripes: for men, hung from a bar, and for women, on a ribbon bow, both pinned to the left chest. Individual already possessing a Medal of Bravery be awarded the medal again for subsequent acts of bravery are granted a medal bar, in silver and bearing a maple leaf, for wear on the ribbon from which the original medal is suspended.

Eligibility and receipt
On 1 May 1972, Queen Elizabeth II, on the advice of her Cabinet under Prime Minister Pierre Trudeau, created the Medal of Bravery to recognize acts of great gallantry. The name of any person, living or deceased, may be submitted to the Canadian Decorations Advisory Council a part of the Chancellery of Honours at Government House as a possible recipient of the Medal of Bravery. It is not necessary that the act of bravery take place in Canada, nor must the person who carried out the act be a Canadian; however, the event must have involved Canadians and/or Canadian interests. Nominations can be made no later than two years following either the act of bravery itself or the conclusion of any coroner's or court's inquest into the events for which the person was nominated. Once they have been decorated with the Medal of Bravery, recipients are granted the right to use the post-nominal letters MB. , the Medal of Bravery has been presented to at least 3300 people, and there have been at least two Bars issued.

Commemoration
The Royal Canadian Mint in 2006 released a general circulation commemorative quarter showing on the reverse a variation of the design of the Medal of Bravery.

Recipients
The following are some notable recipients of the Medal of Bravery:
 Charles Stanley Winsor *, awarded 27 August 1990 and awarded bar 10 May 1999 
 Robert Binder , awarded 26 November 2010
 Mary Margaret 'Diane' Brock , awarded 2 December 1977
 Dennis Robinson , awarded 7 May 1984
 Joseph Jacques Mario Charette , awarded 1 February 1994
 Konrad Lionel Shourie , awarded 18 April 2002
 Éric Fortier , awarded 18 April 2002
 M. Mohamed Chelali , awarded 19 June 2003
 Paul Landry , awarded 26 February 2002
 John Boyarski , awarded 19 August 1989
 Gerry Dawson  , awarded 10 May 1999
 Brett Cairns  , awarded 11 Dec 1989
 Milton Keith Chute  , awarded 21 June 1991
 Ranger Fontaine Robert Fiddler   CD, awarded 23 November 2017
 James Arthur (Jae) Elvish MB*  awarded 27 September 2013 and awarded Bar 30 September 2015
 Gillian Irene MacAulay , awarded 22 October 2010

See also
 Canadian order of precedence (decorations and medals)
 State decoration

References

External links
 

Civil awards and decorations of Canada
Awards established in 1972
Courage awards